150 metres is a sprint event in track and field. It is a very rarely contested non-championship and not an IAAF-recognised event. Given the proportion of standard running tracks, the event typically incorporates a bend when held in a track and field stadium, although some especially-built tracks allow the event to take place entirely on a straight.

The event was given a high-profile outing in 1997 as an intermediate contest between two 1996 Olympic champions: Donovan Bailey (100 metres) and Michael Johnson (200 metres). Johnson pulled up mid-race, allowing Bailey to win the $1 million prize. This race coincided with a period of similar 150 m meetings between Bailey and the 1992 Olympic champion Linford Christie; the pair raced three years running for high cash prizes in Sheffield, England, in 1995, 1996 and 1997, with Christie winning the first two outings and Bailey winning the last.

The Manchester City Games in England – a competition featuring a long, raised track on one of the city's major streets – has provided many of the event's highlights since 2009, including the men's world best of 14.35 seconds, set by Usain Bolt in 2009. Allyson Felix ran the fastest ever 150 m race by a woman in 2013 (16.36 seconds), although faster times have been recorded at intermediate stages of the 200 m event. The Great North City Games (held variously in Newcastle and Gateshead) features a similar setup to the Manchester event and has provided several of the best men's and women's times. The British events typically attracted American, British and Caribbean competitors, and athletes from these places account for nearly all the top 25 best times for men and women. A one-off 150 m race on Copacabana Beach in Rio de Janeiro was held in 2013 and Bolt finished in a time close to his own world record.

The 150 m had some significance as a regular indoor event in the 1960s and 1970s as a result of indoor tracks matching that distance. Wales held a national championship over the distance up to 1972 and Finland briefly had a women's national championship in the mid 1960s. A relay version of the distance (4 × 150 metres) was contested at the 1967 European Athletics Indoor Championships and was won by the Soviet Union's women's team. The distance attracted the attention of 1980 Olympic 200 m champion Pietro Mennea, whose hand-timed run of 14.8 seconds in Cassino, Italy, in 1983 stood as a world best time for over a quarter of a century. Italy also provided a women's 150 m best that same decade, with Jamaican Merlene Ottey setting a time of 16.46 seconds in Trapani in 1989 – a world best mark which was unbeaten for over two decades.

All-time top 25
+ = en route to 200 m performance
straight = performance on straight track
NWI = no wind measurement

Men

Notes
Below is a list of other times equal or superior to 14.88:
Usain Bolt also ran 14.42 straight (2013), 14.44+ (2009), 14.85+ (2007).
Tyson Gay also ran 14.51 (2011), 14.75+ (2007).
Noah Lyles also ran 14.77 (2018).
Pietro Mennea ran 14.8 (ht) (1983).
Marlon Devonish also ran 14.88 straight (2010).

Assisted marks
Any performance with a following wind of more than 2.0 metres per second is not counted for record purposes. Below is a list of the fastest wind-assisted times (inside 14.92). Only times that are superior to legal bests are shown.
Linford Christie (GBR) ran 14.74 s (+3.9 m/s) on 23 July 1995 in Sheffield
Donovan Bailey (CAN) ran 14.92 s (+3.9 m/s) on 23 July 1995 in Sheffield.

Women

Notes
Below is a list of other times equal or superior to 16.70:
Allyson Felix also ran 16.36 straight (2013).
Shaunae Miller-Uibo also ran 16.37 straight (2019).
Merlene Ottey also ran 16.46 bend (1989).
Michelle-Lee Ahye also ran 16.60 straight (2019).

References

Events in track and field